Alard Stradivarius is a sobriquet used for two violins fabricated by Antonio Stradivari:

Alard-Baron Knoop Stradivarius of 1715
Artot-Alard Stradivarius of 1728